The 1994 African Men's Handball Championship was the eleventh edition of the African Men's Handball Championship, held in Tunis, Tunisia, from 5 to 24 November 1994. It acted as the African qualifying tournament for the 1995 World Championship in Iceland.

Tunisia win their fourth title beating Algeria in the final game 18–16.

Qualified teams

Venue
El Menzah Sports Palace, Tunis

Group stage

Knockout stage

Third place game

Final

Final ranking

References

African handball championships
Handball
A
Handball
Handball in Tunisia
20th century in Tunis
Sports competitions in Tunis
November 1994 sports events in Africa